Kurān wa Munjān, also spelled Kiran wa Munjan (‘Alāqahdārī Kirān wa Munjān) or Koran va Monjan, is a village in Badakhshan Province in north-eastern Afghanistan.  It is the capital of Kuran wa Munjan District.

Climate

Owing to its altitude, Kuran wa Munjan features a subarctic climate (Dsc) bordering on a tundra climate (ET) under the Köppen climate classification. It has brief, pleasant summers and very cold, snowy winters. Winters are extremely long with below-freezing months from October until May.

References

Populated places in Kuran wa Munjan District